SDR may refer to:

Science and technology 

 ETSI Satellite Digital Radio
 Selective dorsal rhizotomy, a neurosurgery
 Short-chain dehydrogenase, short-chain dehydrogenases/reductases family, SDR family
 Single data rate, in synchronous dynamic random-access memory (SDRAM)
 Software-defined radio, enabling PCs to tune a wide spectrum of radio frequencies, using software instead of hardware for modulation and demodulation
 Sony Dream Robot, later dubbed QRIO
 Sparse distributed representation, in machine intelligence
 Standard dimension ratio in pipe engineering
 Standard-dynamic-range video, color clarity and realism in images and videos, the current standard for video and cinema displays
 Super Dynamic Range, SDR (audio) or XDR, an encoding system for audio cassettes
 System of distinct representatives, in mathematics

Economics 

 Special drawing rights, foreign-exchange reserve assets overseen by the IMF
 Social discount rate, a measure of the value of diverting funds to social projects

Media and entertainment 

 Stardust Records, a Stardust Promotion label
 Süddeutscher Rundfunk, former public broadcaster in Germany, then merged into Südwestrundfunk (SWR)
 Swiss Derivatives Review, a magazine for the futures and options industries

Military 

 Strategic Defence Review, of the UK MoD
 System Design Review of a program, US

Places 

 Santander Airport (IATA airport code)
 Somali Democratic Republic
 Southern Distributor Road, Newport, Wales

Other uses 

 Sales development representative
 School District of Reedsburg
 South Devon Railway, a heritage railway in England